The Battle of Chickamauga is a 1985 video game published by Game Designers' Workshop.

Gameplay
The Battle of Chickamauga is a game in which the Battle of Chickamauga from the American Civil War is recreated.

Reception
Mark Bausman reviewed the game for Computer Gaming World, and stated that "The turn resolution is very quick but still gives a nice "feel" for what happened. Overall, I feel that GDW has a good first entry to the world of computer gaming."

Reviews
Computer Gaming World - Oct, 1990

References

External links
Review in ANALOG Computing
Review in Family Computing

1985 video games
American Civil War video games
Atari 8-bit family games
Atari 8-bit family-only games
Computer wargames
Game Designers' Workshop games
Turn-based strategy video games
Video games developed in the United States
Video games set in Georgia (U.S. state)